Ebba Margareta Palmstierna, born Carlheim-Gyllensköld (27 August 1877 – 9 October 1966) was a Swedish noblewoman and suffragette.

Life 
Palmstierna was born in 1877. She was the daughter of the commander Alfred Edvard Rutger Carlheim-Gyllensköld and of Maria Elisabet Christina Ehrenborg. In 1899, she married Erik Kule Palmstierna (1877-1959), with whom she had several children, one of them Carl-Fredrik Palmstierna. She was active in the National Association for Women's Suffrage in Karlskrona and was in the board of the Karlskronia association that gathered signatures for a 1905 petition for women's sufffrage. She was also one of the signatories on this petition.  In 1917, she was a board member on a national level for the National Association for Women's Suffrage, together with Signe Bergman, Karolina Widerström, Gulli Petrini and Ester Brisman.

Palmstierna wrote down her memoirs during her lifetime. They were published in 1973 posthumous in two volumes, one of them ranging from 1877 until 1905 and another one from 1907 until 1922.

References 

20th-century Swedish people
1966 deaths
1877 births
Swedish suffragists